Airport Terminal 2 Station may refer to:

 Airport Terminal 2 Station (Taoyuan Metro), a station that serves Taoyuan International Airport, Taiwan.
 Narita Airport Terminal 2·3 Station, a station that serves Narita International Airport, Japan; previously known as Airport Terminal 2 Station.